Fritz Zulauf (19 April 1883 – 5 December 1941) was a Swiss sport shooter who competed in the 1920 Summer Olympics.

In 1920 he won a bronze medal in the 30 metre military pistol event and a second bronze medal as member of the Swiss team in the team 30 metre military pistol competition. He was also part of the Swiss team which finished ninth in the team 50 metre free pistol competition.

References

External links
 

1893 births
1941 deaths
Swiss male sport shooters
ISSF pistol shooters
Olympic shooters of Switzerland
Shooters at the 1920 Summer Olympics
Olympic bronze medalists for Switzerland
Olympic medalists in shooting
Medalists at the 1920 Summer Olympics